Soldiers of Salamis (Spanish: Soldados de Salamina) is a novel about the Spanish Civil War published in 2001 by Spanish author Javier Cercas. The book was acclaimed by critics in Spain and was top of the best-seller book list there for many months.  A film adaptation Soldados de Salamina was released in 2003. The English translation by Anne McLean won the Independent Foreign Fiction Prize for 2004.

Book
The book's title is a metaphorical allusion to the famous Battle of Salamis in which the Athenian fleet defeated the Persians. It is composed in a mixture of fact and fiction, which is something of a speciality of the author.

Soldiers of Salamis has sometimes been viewed in the context of a national debate in the first decade of the twenty-first century about how the Spanish Civil War should be commemorated.  The year 2000 saw the foundation of the Association for the Recovery of Historical Memory which grew out of the quest by a sociologist, Emilio Silva-Barrera, to locate and identify the remains of his grandfather, who was shot by Nationalist forces in 1936. In the political arena, the Law of Historical Memory of 2007 attempted to move on from the pact of forgetting adopted by the Spanish at the time of the transition to democracy. Cercas thinks many Spanish people of his generation have been reluctant to write about the Civil War (which was experienced directly by their grandparents' generation).  However, he views the pact of forgetting as a mainly political construct, given the fact that some books and films about the Civil War were produced despite the influence of the pact.

Plot
The novel is divided into three sections. The first and third section depict the historical investigation of a fictional Javier Cercas into the life of the falangist Rafael Sánchez Mazas. The second section is a biographical retelling of Mazas's life.

In the first section of the novel, a fictionalized version of the author, also called Javier Cercas and a journalist, interviews the son of Mazas. During the interview Cercas is told the story of how Mazas's escapes from execution by the Republicans at the end of the Spanish Civil War with the help of a lone soldier. Encouraged by his eccentric girlfriend, a TV fortune teller, Javier begins investigating the incident. Early on, he writes a brief article in his newspaper based on the retelling by Mazas's son. In response to this Cercas becomes obsessed with finding the soldier who spared the life of Mazas.

The second section of the novel takes place during the war itself (1936–1939). The nucleus of this section of the book is Rafael Sánchez Mazas's life. Cercas presents him as a writer and idealist of the Falange Española and close collaborator of José Antonio Primo de Rivera. The narrative in this section focuses on the particulars of his escape from execution at the end of the Spanish Civil War. When a group of prisoners is taken to the forest to be executed, Mazas is able to flee and hide in the bush. A Republican soldier finds him but decides to spare his life and when asked by another soldier if anyone is there he replies that no one is. Helped by several deserters, Mazas evades the retreating Republican forces and eventually returns to Nationalist custody where he became an important propagandist for Francoist Spain.

In the third section in the novel, after having written the biography in the second section, the Cercas character is still curious about the story of Mazas's escape. Following a series of leads, Cercas comes in contact with an old man named Miralles. Miralles had fought for the Republicans in the civil war and later became a member of the French Foreign Legion responsible for heroic feats during the Second World War. Cercas discovers him sequestered in a retirement home in his old age. Cercas comes to believe that Miralles was the soldier who saved Mazas from execution. However, Miralles will neither confirm nor deny having been the soldier to save Mazas. The fictional Cercas ends the novel with a monologue questioning the historical explanation which he had investigated and the nature of heroes.

Film

Soldados de Salamina was adapted by the director and screenwriter David Trueba, premiering in Spain on March 21, 2003.

References

External links
Podcast of Javier Cercas talking about Soldiers of Salamis.  First broadcast in March 2011 on the BBC World Service's World Book Club

21st-century Spanish novels
2001 novels
Novels set during the Spanish Civil War